Salma Begum Sujata (born Tandra Majumder), known mononymously as Sujata, is a retired Bangladeshi film actress. She is best known for her role in Rupban (1965) as Rupban Konna. She was awarded Bangladesh National Film Award for Lifetime Achievement in 2017 and Ekushey Padak in 2021.

Career
Sujata debuted in acting through the film Rupban in 1965.

Personal life
Sujata married actor Azim on 30 June 1967. She was born a Hindu and converted to Islam.

Works

References

Further reading

External links

Living people
People from Kushtia District
Bangladeshi film actresses
Bengali actresses
Year of birth missing (living people)
National Film Award (Bangladesh) for Lifetime Achievement recipients
Recipients of the Ekushey Padak